The Palau Island blind snake (Ramphotyphlops acuticauda) is a species of snake in the Typhlopidae family.

References

Ramphotyphlops
Reptiles described in 1877
Taxa named by Wilhelm Peters
Taxobox binomials not recognized by IUCN